Crafton is both a surname and a given name. Notable people with the name include:
 
 Alton Crafton (born 1969), Saint Lucian cricketer
 Jason Crafton (born 1982), American basketball coach
 Matt Crafton (born 1976), American racing driver